Hungary competed at the 1956 Winter Olympics in Cortina d'Ampezzo, Italy.

Medalists

Figure skating

Pairs

References
Official Olympic Reports
International Olympic Committee results database
 Olympic Winter Games 1956, full results by sports-reference.com

Nations at the 1956 Winter Olympics
1956
1956 in Hungarian sport